Mikhail Nikolayevich Perevalov (1930 in Moscow – 1995 in Moscow) was a Soviet football player.

Honours
 Soviet Cup winner: 1955.

International career
Perevalov played his only game for USSR on September 16, 1955 in a friendly against India.

External links
  Profile

1930 births
1995 deaths
Russian footballers
Soviet footballers
Soviet Union international footballers
FC Spartak Moscow players
PFC CSKA Moscow players
Association football defenders